Pu Lalhmingthanga (born 3 June 1940) is an Indian politician who is the chief of the Mizoram People's Conference, a recognised political party in the Indian state of Mizoram. He was a member of the Mizoram Legislative Assembly representing Lunglei South (Legislative Assembly constituency) in 2003-2008.

References

Mizo people
Living people
1940 births
Place of birth missing (living people)